Cuneiform is a logo-syllabic script that was used to write several languages of the Ancient Middle East. The script was in active use from the early Bronze Age until the beginning of the Common Era. It is named for the characteristic wedge-shaped impressions which form its signs. Cuneiform was originally developed to write the Sumerian language of southern Mesopotamia (modern Iraq). Cuneiform is the earliest known writing system.

Over the course of its history, cuneiform was adapted to write a number of languages in addition to Sumerian. Akkadian texts are attested from the 24th century BC onward and make up the bulk of the cuneiform record. Akkadian cuneiform was itself adapted to write the Hittite language in the early second millennium BC. The other languages with significant cuneiform corpora are Eblaite, Elamite, Hurrian, Luwian, and Urartian. The Old Persian and Ugaritic alphabets feature cuneiform-style signs; however, they are unrelated to the cuneiform logo-syllabary proper.

The latest known cuneiform tablet dates to 75 AD. The script fell totally out of use soon after and was forgotten until its rediscovery and decipherment in the 19th century. The study of cuneiform belongs to the field of Assyriology. An estimated half a million tablets are held in museums across the world, but comparatively few of these are published. The largest collections belong to the British Museum ( 130,000 tablets), the Vorderasiatisches Museum Berlin, the Louvre, the Istanbul Archaeology Museums, the National Museum of Iraq, the Yale Babylonian Collection ( 40,000 tablets), and Penn Museum.

History

Writing began after pottery was invented, during the Neolithic, when clay tokens were used to record specific amounts of livestock or commodities. In recent years a contrarian view has arisen on the tokens being the precursor of writing. These tokens were initially impressed on the surface of round clay envelopes (clay bullae) and then stored in them. The tokens were then progressively replaced by flat tablets, on which signs were recorded with a stylus. Writing is first recorded in Uruk, at the end of the 4th millennium BC, and soon after in various parts of the Near-East.

An ancient Mesopotamian poem gives the first known story of the invention of writing:

The cuneiform writing system was in use for more than three millennia, through several stages of development, from the 31st century BC down to the second century AD. The latest firmly dateable tablet, from Uruk, dates to 79/80 AD. Ultimately, it was completely replaced by alphabetic writing (in the general sense) in the course of the Roman era, and there are no cuneiform systems in current use. It had to be deciphered as a completely unknown writing system in 19th-century Assyriology. It was successfully deciphered by 1857.

Sumerian pictographs (circa 3300 BC)

The cuneiform script was developed from pictographic proto-writing in the late 4th millennium BC, stemming from the near eastern token system used for accounting. The meaning and usage of these tokens is still a matter of debate. These tokens were in use from the 9th millennium BC and remained in occasional use even late in the 2nd millennium BC. Early tokens with pictographic shapes of animals, associated with numbers, were discovered in Tell Brak, and date to the mid-4th millennium BC. It has been suggested that the token shapes were the original basis for some of the Sumerian pictographs.

Mesopotamia's "proto-literate" period spans roughly the 35th to 32nd centuries BC. The first unequivocal written documents start with the Uruk IV period, from circa 3,300 BC, followed by tablets found in Uruk III, Jemdet Nasr, Early Dynastic I Ur and Susa (in Proto-Elamite) dating to the period until circa 2,900 BC. 
Originally, pictographs were either drawn on clay tablets in vertical columns with a sharpened reed stylus or incised in stone. This early style lacked the characteristic wedge shape of the strokes.
Most Proto-Cuneiform records from this period were of an accounting nature.
 The proto-cuneiform sign list has grown, as new texts are discovered, and shrunk, as variant signs are combined. The current sign list is 705 elements long with 42 being numeric and four considered pre-proto-Elamite.

Certain signs to indicate names of gods, countries, cities, vessels, birds, trees, etc., are known as determinatives and were the Sumerian signs of the terms in question, added as a guide for the reader. Proper names continued to be usually written in purely "logographic" fashion.

Archaic cuneiform (circa 2900 BC)

The first inscribed tablets were purely pictographic, which makes it technically difficult to know in which language they were written. Different languages have been proposed though usually Sumerian is assumed. Later tablets after circa 2,900 BC start to use syllabic elements, which clearly show a language structure typical of the non-Indo-European agglutinative Sumerian language. The first tablets using syllabic elements date to the Early Dynastic I–II, circa 2,800 BC, and they are agreed to be clearly in Sumerian. This is the time when some pictographic element started to be used for their phonetical value, permitting the recording of abstract ideas or personal names. Many pictographs began to lose their original function, and a given sign could have various meanings depending on context. The sign inventory was reduced from some 1,500 signs to some 600 signs, and writing became increasingly phonological. Determinative signs were re-introduced to avoid ambiguity. Cuneiform writing proper thus arises from the more primitive system of pictographs at about that time (Early Bronze Age II).

The earliest known Sumerian king, whose name appears on contemporary cuneiform tablets, is Enmebaragesi of Kish (fl. c. 2600 BC). Surviving records became less fragmentary for following reigns and by the end of the pre-Sargonic period it had become standard practice for each major city-state to date documents by year-names, commemorating the exploits of its lugal (king).

Cuneiforms and hieroglyphs
Geoffrey Sampson stated that Egyptian hieroglyphs "came into existence a little after Sumerian script, and, probably, [were] invented under the influence of the latter", and that it is "probable that the general idea of expressing words of a language in writing was brought to Egypt from Sumerian Mesopotamia". There are many instances of Egypt-Mesopotamia relations at the time of the invention of writing, and standard reconstructions of the development of writing generally place the development of the Sumerian proto-cuneiform script before the development of Egyptian hieroglyphs, with the suggestion the former influenced the latter.

Early Dynastic cuneiform (circa 2500 BC)

Early cuneiform inscription were made by using a pointed stylus, sometimes called "linear cuneiform". Many of the early dynastic inscriptions, particularly those made on stone, continued to use the linear style as late as circa 2000 BC.

In the mid-3rd millennium BC, a new wedge-tipped stylus was introduced which was pushed into the clay, producing wedge-shaped cuneiform. This development made writing quicker and easier, especially when writing on soft clay. By adjusting the relative position of the stylus to the tablet, the writer could use a single tool to make a variety of impressions. For numbers, a round-tipped stylus was initially used, until the wedge-tipped stylus was generalized. The direction of writing was from top-to-bottom and right-to-left. Cuneiform clay tablets could be fired in kilns to bake them hard, and so provide a permanent record, or they could be left moist and recycled if permanence was not needed, so surviving cuneiform tablets have largely been preserved by accident.

The script was also widely used on commemorative stelae and carved reliefs to record the achievements of the ruler in whose honor the monument had been erected. The spoken language included many homophones and near-homophones, and in the beginning, similar-sounding words such as "life" [til] and "arrow" [ti] were written with the same symbol. WIth the rise of the Akkadian language some signs gradually changed from being pictograms to syllabograms, most likely to make things clearer in writing. In that way, the sign for the word "arrow" would become the sign for the sound "ti".

Words that sounded alike would have different signs; for instance, the syllable [ɡu] had fourteen different symbols.
When the words had a similar meaning but very different sounds they were written with the same symbol. For instance 'tooth' [zu], 'mouth' [ka] and 'voice' [gu] were all written with the symbol for "voice". To be more accurate, scribes started adding to signs or combining two signs to define the meaning. They used either geometrical patterns or another cuneiform sign.

As time went by, the cuneiform got very complex and the distinction between a pictogram and syllabogram became vague. Several symbols had too many meanings to permit clarity. Therefore, symbols were put together to indicate both the sound and the meaning of a compound. The word 'raven' [UGA] had the same logogram as the word 'soap' [NAGA], the name of a city [EREŠ], and the patron goddess of Eresh [NISABA]. Two phonetic complements were used to define the word [u] in front of the symbol and [gu] behind. Finally, the symbol for 'bird' [MUŠEN] was added to ensure proper interpretation.

For unknown reasons, cuneiform pictographs, until then written vertically, were rotated 90° counterclockwise, in effect putting them on their side. This change first occurred slightly before the Akkadian period, at the time of the Uruk ruler Lugalzagesi (r. c. 2294–2270 BC). The vertical style remained for monumental purposes on stone stelas until the middle of the 2nd millennium.

Written Sumerian was used as a scribal language until the first century AD. The spoken language died out between about 2100 and 1700 BC.

Sumero-Akkadian cuneiform

The archaic cuneiform script was adopted by the Akkadian Empire from the 23rd century BC (short chronology). The Akkadian language being East Semitic, its structure was completely different from Sumerian. There was no way to use the Sumerian writing system as such, and the Akkadians found a practical solution in writing their language phonetically, using the corresponding Sumerian phonetic signs. Still, some of the Sumerian characters were retained for their pictorial value as well: for example the character for "sheep" was retained, but was now pronounced immerū, rather than the Sumerian "udu-meš".

The East Semitic languages employed equivalents for many signs that were distorted or abbreviated to represent new values because the syllabic nature of the script as refined by the Sumerians was not intuitive to Semitic speakers. From the beginning of the Middle Bronze Age (20th century BC), the script evolved to accommodate the various dialects of Akkadian: Old Akkadian, Babylonian and Assyrian. At this stage, the former pictograms were reduced to a high level of abstraction, and were composed of only five basic wedge shapes: horizontal, vertical, two diagonals and the Winkelhaken impressed vertically by the tip of the stylus. The signs exemplary of these basic wedges are:

 AŠ (B001, U+12038) : horizontal;
 DIŠ (B748, U+12079) : vertical;
 GE23, DIŠ tenû (B575, U+12039) : downward diagonal;
 GE22 (B647, U+1203A) : upward diagonal;
 U (B661, U+1230B) : the Winkelhaken.

Except for the Winkelhaken, which has no tail, the length of the wedges' tails could vary as required for sign composition.

Signs tilted by about 45 degrees are called tenû in Akkadian, thus DIŠ is a vertical wedge and DIŠ tenû a diagonal one. If a sign is modified with additional wedges, this is called gunû or "gunification"; if signs are cross-hatched with additional Winkelhaken, they are called šešig; if signs are modified by the removal of a wedge or wedges, they are called nutillu.

"Typical" signs have about five to ten wedges, while complex ligatures can consist of twenty or more (although it is not always clear if a ligature should be considered a single sign or two collated, but distinct signs); the ligature KAxGUR7 consists of 31 strokes.

Most later adaptations of Sumerian cuneiform preserved at least some aspects of the Sumerian script. Written Akkadian included phonetic symbols from the Sumerian syllabary, together with logograms that were read as whole words. Many signs in the script were polyvalent, having both a syllabic and logographic meaning. The complexity of the system bears a resemblance to Old Japanese, written in a Chinese-derived script, where some of these Sinograms were used as logograms and others as phonetic characters.

Elamite cuneiform

Elamite cuneiform was a simplified form of the Sumero-Akkadian cuneiform, used to write the Elamite language in the area that corresponds to modern Iran. Elamite cuneiform at times competed with other local scripts, Proto-Elamite and Linear Elamite. The earliest known Elamite cuneiform text is a treaty between Akkadians and the Elamites that dates back to 2200 BC. However, some believe it might have been in use since 2500 BC. The tablets are poorly preserved, so only limited parts can be read, but it is understood that the text is a treaty between the Akkad king Nāramsîn and Elamite ruler Hita, as indicated by frequent references like "Nāramsîn's friend is my friend, Nāramsîn's enemy is my enemy".

The most famous Elamite scriptures and the ones that ultimately led to its decipherment are the ones found in the trilingual Behistun inscriptions, commissioned by the Achaemenid kings. The inscriptions, similar to that of the Rosetta Stone's, were written in three different writing systems. The first was Old Persian, which was deciphered in 1802 by Georg Friedrich Grotefend. The second, Babylonian cuneiform, was deciphered shortly after the Old Persian text. Because Elamite is unlike its neighboring Semitic languages, the script's decipherment was delayed until the 1840s. Even today, lack of sources and comparative materials hinder further research of Elamite.

Assyrian cuneiform

This "mixed" method of writing continued through the end of the Babylonian and Assyrian empires, although there were periods when "purism" was in fashion and there was a more marked tendency to spell out the words laboriously, in preference to using signs with a phonetic complement. Yet even in those days, the Babylonian syllabary remained a mixture of logographic and phonemic writing.

Hittite cuneiform is an adaptation of the Old Assyrian cuneiform of c. 1800 BC to the Hittite language. When the cuneiform script was adapted to writing Hittite, a layer of Akkadian logographic spellings was added to the script, thus the pronunciations of many Hittite words which were conventionally written by logograms are now unknown.

In the Iron Age (c. 10th to 6th centuries BC), Assyrian cuneiform was further simplified. The characters remained the same as those of Sumero-Akkadian cuneiforms, but the graphic design of each character relied more heavily on wedges and square angles, making them significantly more abstract. The pronunciation of the characters was replaced by that of the Assyrian dialect of the Akkadian language:

From the 6th century, the Akkadian language was marginalized by Aramaic, written in the Aramaean alphabet, but Neo-Assyrian cuneiform remained in use in the literary tradition well into the times of the Parthian Empire (250 BC–226 AD). The last known cuneiform inscription, an astronomical text, was written in 75 AD. The ability to read cuneiform may have persisted until the third century AD.

Derived scripts

Old Persian cuneiform (5th century BC)

The complexity of cuneiforms prompted the development of a number of simplified versions of the script. Old Persian cuneiform was developed with an independent and unrelated set of simple cuneiform characters, by Darius the Great in the 5th century BC. Most scholars consider this writing system to be an independent invention because it has no obvious connections with other writing systems at the time, such as Elamite, Akkadian, Hurrian, and Hittite cuneiforms.

It formed a semi-alphabetic syllabary, using far fewer wedge strokes than Assyrian used, together with a handful of logograms for frequently occurring words like "god", "king" or "country". This almost purely alphabetical form of the cuneiform script (36 phonetic characters and 8 logograms), was specially designed and used by the early Achaemenid rulers from the 6th century BC down to the 4th century BC.

Because of its simplicity and logical structure, the Old Persian cuneiform script was the first to be deciphered by modern scholars, starting with the accomplishments of Georg Friedrich Grotefend in 1802. Various ancient bilingual or trilingual inscriptions then permitted to decipher the other, much more complicated and more ancient scripts, as far back as to the 3rd millennium Sumerian script.

Ugaritic
Ugaritic was written using the Ugaritic alphabet, a standard Semitic style alphabet (an abjad) written using the cuneiform method.

Archaeology
Between half a million and two million cuneiform tablets are estimated to have been excavated in modern times, of which only approximately 30,000–100,000 have been read or published. The British Museum holds the largest collection (approx. 130,000 tablets), followed by the Vorderasiatisches Museum Berlin, the Louvre, the Istanbul Archaeology Museums, the National Museum of Iraq, the Yale Babylonian Collection (approx. 40,000), and Penn Museum. Most of these have "lain in these collections for a century without being translated, studied or published", as there are only a few hundred qualified cuneiformists in the world.

Decipherment
For centuries, travelers to Persepolis, located in Iran, had noticed carved cuneiform inscriptions and were intrigued. Attempts at deciphering Old Persian cuneiform date back to Arabo-Persian historians of the medieval Islamic world, though these early attempts at decipherment were largely unsuccessful.

In the 15th century, the Venetian Giosafat Barbaro explored ancient ruins in the Middle East and came back with news of a very odd writing he had found carved on the stones in the temples of Shiraz and on many clay tablets.

Antonio de Gouvea, a professor of theology, noted in 1602 the strange writing he had seen during his travels a year earlier in Persia. In 1625, the Roman traveler Pietro Della Valle, who had sojourned in Mesopotamia between 1616 and 1621, brought to Europe copies of characters he had seen in Persepolis and inscribed bricks from Ur and the ruins of Babylon. The copies he made, the first that reached circulation within Europe, were not quite accurate, but Della Valle understood that the writing had to be read from left to right, following the direction of wedges. However, he did not attempt to decipher the scripts.

Englishman Sir Thomas Herbert, in the 1638 edition of his travel book Some Yeares Travels into Africa & Asia the Great, reported seeing at Persepolis carved on the wall "a dozen lines of strange characters...consisting of figures, obelisk, triangular, and pyramidal" and thought they resembled Greek. In the 1677 edition he reproduced some and thought they were 'legible and intelligible' and therefore decipherable. He also guessed, correctly, that they represented not letters or hieroglyphics but words and syllables, and were to be read from left to right. Herbert is rarely mentioned in standard histories of the decipherment of cuneiform.

In 1700 Thomas Hyde first called the inscriptions "cuneiform", but deemed that they were no more than decorative friezes.

Old Persian cuneiform: deduction of the word for "King" (circa 1800)

Proper attempts at deciphering Old Persian cuneiform started with faithful copies of cuneiform inscriptions, which first became available in 1711 when duplicates of Darius's inscriptions were published by Jean Chardin.

Carsten Niebuhr brought very complete and accurate copies of the inscriptions at Persepolis to Europe, published in 1767 in Reisebeschreibungen nach Arabien ("Account of travels to Arabia and other surrounding lands"). The set of characters that would later be known as Old Persian cuneiform, was soon perceived as being the simplest of the three types of cuneiform scripts that had been encountered, and because of this was understood as a prime candidate for decipherment (the two other, older and more complicated scripts were Elamite and Babylonian). Niebuhr identified that there were only 42 characters in the simpler category of inscriptions, which he named "Class I", and affirmed that this must therefore be an alphabetic script.

At about the same time, Anquetil-Duperron came back from India, where he had learnt Pahlavi and Persian under the Parsis, and published in 1771 a translation of the Zend Avesta, thereby making known Avestan, one of the ancient Iranian languages. With this basis, Antoine Isaac Silvestre de Sacy was able to start the study of Middle Persian in 1792–93, during the French Revolution, and he realized that the inscriptions of Naqsh-e Rostam had a rather stereotyped structure on the model: "Name of the King, the Great King, the King of Iran and Aniran, son of N., the Great King, etc...". He published his results in 1793 in Mémoire sur diverses antiquités de la Perse.

In 1798, Oluf Gerhard Tychsen made the first study of the inscriptions of Persepolis copied by Niebuhr. He discovered that series of characters in the Persian inscriptions were divided from one another by an oblique wedge and that these must be individual words. He also found that a specific group of seven letters was recurring in the inscriptions, and that they had a few recurring terminations of three to four letters. However, Tychsen mistakenly attributed the texts to Arsacid kings, and therefore was unable to make further progress.

Friedrich Münter Bishop of Copenhagen improved over the work of Tychsen, and proved that the inscriptions must belong to the age of Cyrus and his successors, which led to the suggestion that the inscriptions were in the Old Persian language and probably mentioned Achaemenid kings. He suggested that the long word appearing with high frequency and without any variation towards the beginning of each inscription must correspond to the word "King", and that repetitions of this sequence must mean "King of Kings". He correctly guessed that the sequence must be pronounced kh-sha-a-ya-th-i-ya, a word of the same root as the Avestan xšaΘra- and the Sanskrit kṣatra- meaning "power" and "command", and now known to be pronounced xšāyaθiya in Old Persian.

Old Persian cuneiform: deduction of the names of Achaemenid rulers and translation (1802)

By 1802 Georg Friedrich Grotefend conjectured that, based on the known inscriptions of much later rulers (the Pahlavi inscriptions of the Sassanid kings), a king's name is often followed by "great king, king of kings" and the name of the king's father. This understanding of the structure of monumental inscriptions in Old Persian was based on the work of Anquetil-Duperron, who had studied Old Persian through the Zoroastrian Avestas in India, and Antoine Isaac Silvestre de Sacy, who had decrypted the monumental Pahlavi inscriptions of the Sassanid kings.

Looking at the length of the character sequences in the Niebuhr inscriptions 1 & 2, and comparing with the names and genealogy of the Achaemenid kings as known from the Greeks, also taking into account the fact that the father of one of the rulers in the inscriptions didn't have the attribute "king", he made the correct guess that this could be no other than Darius the Great, his father Hystaspes who was not a king, and his son the famous Xerxes. In Persian history around the time period the inscriptions were expected to be made, there were only two instances where a ruler came to power without being a previous king's son. They were Darius the Great and Cyrus the Great, both of whom became emperor by revolt. The deciding factors between these two choices were the names of their fathers and sons. Darius's father was Hystaspes and his son was Xerxes, while Cyrus' father was Cambyses I and his son was Cambyses II. Within the text, the father and son of the king had different groups of symbols for names so Grotefend assumed that the king must have been Darius.

These connections allowed Grotefend to figure out the cuneiform characters that are part of Darius, Darius's father Hystaspes, and Darius's son Xerxes. He equated the letters  with the name d-a-r-h-e-u-sh for Darius, as known from the Greeks. This identification was correct, although the actual Persian spelling was da-a-ra-ya-va-u-sha, but this was unknown at the time. Grotefend similarly equated the sequence  with kh-sh-h-e-r-sh-e for Xerxes, which again was right, but the actual Old Persian transcription was wsa-sha-ya-a-ra-sha-a. Finally, he matched the sequence of the father who was not a king  with Hystaspes, but again with the supposed Persian reading of g-o-sh-t-a-s-p, rather than the actual Old Persian vi-i-sha-ta-a-sa-pa.

By this method, Grotefend had correctly identified each king in the inscriptions, but his identification of the value of individual letters was still quite defective, for want of a better understanding of the Old Persian language itself. Grotefend only identified correctly eight letters among the thirty signs he had collated. However groundbreaking, this inductive method failed to convince academics, and the official recognition of his work was denied for nearly a generation. Although Grotefend's Memoir was presented to the Göttingen Academy of Sciences and Humanities on September 4, 1802, the academy refused to publish it; it was subsequently published in Heeren's work in 1815, but was overlooked by most researchers at the time.

External confirmation through Egyptian hieroglyphs (1823)

It was only in 1823 that Grotefend's discovery was confirmed, when the French philologist Champollion, who had just deciphered Egyptian hieroglyphs, was able to read the Egyptian dedication of a quadrilingual hieroglyph-cuneiform inscription on an alabaster vase in the Cabinet des Médailles, the Caylus vase. The Egyptian inscription on the vase was in the name of King Xerxes I, and the orientalist Antoine-Jean Saint-Martin, who accompanied Champollion, was able to confirm that the corresponding words in the cuneiform script were indeed the words which Grotefend had identified as meaning "king" and "Xerxes" through guesswork. In effect the decipherment of Egyptian hieroglyphs was thus decisive in confirming the first steps of the decipherment of the cuneiform script.

Consolidation of the Old Persian cuneiform alphabet
In 1836, the eminent French scholar Eugène Burnouf discovered that the first of the inscriptions published by Niebuhr contained a list of the satrapies of Darius. With this clue in his hand, he identified and published an alphabet of thirty letters, most of which he had correctly deciphered.

A month earlier, a friend and pupil of Burnouf's, Professor Christian Lassen of Bonn, had also published his own work on The Old Persian Cuneiform Inscriptions of Persepolis. He and Burnouf had been in frequent correspondence, and his claim to have independently detected the names of the satrapies, and thereby to have fixed the values of the Persian characters, was consequently fiercely attacked. According to Sayce, whatever his obligations to Burnouf may have been, Lassen's

Decipherment of Elamite and Babylonian 

Meanwhile, in 1835 Henry Rawlinson, a British East India Company army officer, visited the Behistun Inscriptions in Persia. Carved in the reign of King Darius of Persia (522–486 BC), they consisted of identical texts in the three official languages of the empire: Old Persian, Babylonian and Elamite. The Behistun inscription was to the decipherment of cuneiform what the Rosetta Stone (discovered in 1799) was to the decipherment of Egyptian hieroglyphs in 1822.

Rawlinson successfully completed the decipherment of Old Persian cuneiform. In 1837, he finished his copy of the Behistun inscription, and sent a translation of its opening paragraphs to the Royal Asiatic Society. Before his article could be published, however, the works of Lassen and Burnouf reached him, necessitating a revision of his article and the postponement of its publication. Then came other causes of delay. In 1847, the first part of the Rawlinson's Memoir was published; the second part did not appear until 1849. The task of deciphering Old Persian cuneiform texts was virtually accomplished.

After translating Old Persian, Rawlinson and, working independently of him, the Irish Assyriologist Edward Hincks, began to decipher the other cuneiform scripts. The decipherment of Old Persian was thus notably instrumental to the decipherment of Elamite and Babylonian, thanks to the trilingual Behistun inscription.

Decipherment of Akkadian and Sumerian

The decipherment of Babylonian ultimately led to the decipherment of Akkadian, which was a close predecessor of Babylonian. The actual techniques used to decipher the Akkadian language have never been fully published; Hincks described how he sought the proper names already legible in the deciphered Persian while Rawlinson never said anything at all, leading some to speculate that he was secretly copying Hincks. They were greatly helped by the excavations of the French naturalist Paul Émile Botta and English traveler and diplomat Austen Henry Layard of the city of Nineveh from 1842. Among the treasures uncovered by Layard and his successor Hormuzd Rassam were, in 1849 and 1851, the remains of two libraries, now mixed up, usually called the Library of Ashurbanipal, a royal archive containing tens of thousands of baked clay tablets covered with cuneiform inscriptions.

By 1851, Hincks and Rawlinson could read 200 Akkadian signs. They were soon joined by two other decipherers: young German-born scholar Julius Oppert, and versatile British Orientalist William Henry Fox Talbot. In 1857, the four men met in London and took part in a famous experiment to test the accuracy of their decipherments. Edwin Norris, the secretary of the Royal Asiatic Society, gave each of them a copy of a recently discovered inscription from the reign of the Assyrian emperor Tiglath-Pileser I. A jury of experts was impaneled to examine the resulting translations and assess their accuracy. In all essential points, the translations produced by the four scholars were found to be in close agreement with one another. There were, of course, some slight discrepancies. The inexperienced Talbot had made a number of mistakes, and Oppert's translation contained a few doubtful passages which the jury politely ascribed to his unfamiliarity with the English language. But Hincks' and Rawlinson's versions corresponded remarkably closely in many respects. The jury declared itself satisfied, and the decipherment of Akkadian cuneiform was adjudged a fait accompli.

Finally, Sumerian, the oldest language with a script, was also deciphered through the analysis of ancient Akkadian-Sumerian dictionaries and bilingual tablets, as Sumerian long remained a literary language in Mesopotamia, which was often re-copied, translated and commented in numerous Babylonian tablets.

Proper names
In the early days of cuneiform decipherment, the reading of proper names presented the greatest difficulties. However, there is now a better understanding of the principles behind the formation and the pronunciation of the thousands of names found in historical records, business documents, votive inscriptions, literary productions, and legal documents. The primary challenge was posed by the characteristic use of old Sumerian non-phonetic logograms in other languages that had different pronunciations for the same symbols. Until the exact phonetic reading of many names was determined through parallel passages or explanatory lists, scholars remained in doubt or had recourse to conjectural or provisional readings. However, in many cases, there are variant readings, the same name being written phonetically (in whole or in part) in one instance and logographically in another.

Digital approaches
Computer-based methods are being developed to digitise tablets and help decipher texts.

Transliteration

 
Cuneiform has a specific format for transliteration. Because of the script's polyvalence, transliteration requires certain choices of the transliterating scholar, who must decide in the case of each sign which of its several possible meanings is intended in the original document. For example, the sign dingir in a Hittite text may represent either the Hittite syllable an or may be part of an Akkadian phrase, representing the syllable il, it may be a Sumerogram, representing the original Sumerian meaning, 'god' or the determinative for a deity. In transliteration, a different rendition of the same glyph is chosen depending on its role in the present context.

Therefore, a text containing DINGIR and MU in succession could be construed to represent the words "ana", "ila", god + "a" (the accusative case ending), god + water, or a divine name "A" or Water. Someone transcribing the signs would make the decision how the signs should be read and assemble the signs as "ana", "ila", "Ila" ("god"+accusative case), etc. A transliteration of these signs, however, would separate the signs with dashes "il-a", "an-a", "DINGIR-a" or "Da". This is still easier to read than the original cuneiform, but now the reader is able to trace the sounds back to the original signs and determine if the correct decision was made on how to read them. A transliterated document thus presents the reading preferred by the transliterating scholar as well as an opportunity to reconstruct the original text.

There are differing conventions for transliterating Sumerian, Akkadian (Babylonian), and Hittite (and Luwian) cuneiform texts. One convention that sees wide use across the different fields is the use of acute and grave accents as an abbreviation for homophone disambiguation. Thus, u is equivalent to u1, the first glyph expressing phonetic u. An acute accent, ú, is equivalent to the second, u2, and a grave accent ù to the third, u3 glyph in the series (while the sequence of numbering is conventional but essentially arbitrary and subject to the history of decipherment). In Sumerian transliteration, a multiplication sign ('×') is used to indicate typographic ligatures. As shown above, signs as such are represented in capital letters, while the specific reading selected in the transliteration is represented in small letters. Thus, capital letters can be used to indicate a so-called Diri compound – a sign sequence that has, in combination, a reading different from the sum of the individual constituent signs (for example, the compound IGI.A – "eye" + "water" – has the reading imhur, meaning "foam"). In a Diri compound, the individual signs are separated with dots in transliteration. Capital letters may also be used to indicate a Sumerogram (for example, KÙ.BABBAR – Sumerian for "silver" – being used with the intended Akkadian reading kaspum, "silver"), an Akkadogram, or simply a sign sequence of whose reading the editor is uncertain. Naturally, the "real" reading, if it is clear, will be presented in small letters in the transliteration: IGI.A will be rendered as imhur4.

Since the Sumerian language has only been widely known and studied by scholars for approximately a century, changes in the accepted reading of Sumerian names have occurred from time to time. Thus the name of a king of Ur, read Ur-Bau at one time, was later read as Ur-Engur, and is now read as Ur-Nammu or Ur-Namma; for Lugal-zage-si, a king of Uruk, some scholars continued to read Ungal-zaggisi; and so forth. Also, with some names of the older period, there was often uncertainty whether their bearers were Sumerians or Semites. If the former, then their names could be assumed to be read as Sumerian, while, if they were Semites, the signs for writing their names were probably to be read according to their Semitic equivalents, though occasionally Semites might be encountered bearing genuine Sumerian names. There was also doubt whether the signs composing a Semite's name represented a phonetic reading or a logographic compound. Thus, e.g. when inscriptions of a Semitic ruler of Kish, whose name was written Uru-mu-ush, were first deciphered, that name was first taken to be logographic because uru mu-ush could be read as "he founded a city" in Sumerian, and scholars accordingly retranslated it back to the original Semitic as Alu-usharshid. It was later recognized that the URU sign can also be read as rí and that the name is that of the Akkadian king Rimush.

Syllabary
The table below shows signs used for simple syllables of the form CV or VC. As used for the Sumerian language, the cuneiform script was in principle capable of distinguishing at least 16 consonants, transliterated as

as well as four vowel qualities, a, e, i, u.
The Akkadian language had no use for g̃ or ř but needed to distinguish its emphatic series, q, ṣ, ṭ, adopting various "superfluous" Sumerian signs for the purpose (e.g. qe=KIN, qu=KUM, qi=KIN, ṣa=ZA, ṣe=ZÍ, ṭur=DUR etc.)
Hittite, as it adopted the Akkadian cuneiform, further introduced signs such as wi5=GEŠTIN.

Sign inventories

The Sumerian cuneiform script had on the order of 1,000 distinct signs (or about 1,500 if variants are included). This number was reduced to about 600 by the 24th century BC and the beginning of Akkadian records. Not all Sumerian signs are used in Akkadian texts, and not all Akkadian signs are used in Hittite.

A. Falkenstein (1936) lists 939 signs used in the earliest period (late Uruk, 34th to 31st centuries). (See #Bibliography for the works mentioned in this paragraph.)
With an emphasis on Sumerian forms, Deimel (1922) lists 870 signs used in the Early Dynastic II period (28th century, Liste der archaischen Keilschriftzeichen or "LAK") and for the Early Dynastic IIIa period (26th century, Šumerisches Lexikon or "ŠL").
Rosengarten (1967) lists 468 signs used in Sumerian (pre-Sargonian) Lagash,
and Mittermayer and Attinger (2006,  Altbabylonische Zeichenliste der Sumerisch-Literarischen Texte or "aBZL") list 480 Sumerian forms, written in Isin-Larsa and Old Babylonian times. Regarding Akkadian forms, the standard handbook for many years was Borger (1981, Assyrisch-Babylonische Zeichenliste or "ABZ") with 598 signs used in Assyrian/Babylonian writing, recently superseded by Borger (2004, Mesopotamisches Zeichenlexikon or "MesZL") with an expansion to 907 signs, an extension of their Sumerian readings and a new numbering scheme.

Signs used in Hittite cuneiform are listed by Forrer (1922), Friedrich (1960) and Rüster and Neu (1989, Hethitisches Zeichenlexikon or "HZL"). The HZL lists a total of 375 signs, many with variants (for example, 12 variants are given for number 123 EGIR).

Numerals

The Sumerians used a numerical system based on 1, 10, and 60. The way of writing a number like 70 would be the sign for 60 and the sign for 10 right after.

Usage 

Cuneiform script was used in many ways in ancient Mesopotamia. Besides the well known clay tablets and stone inscriptions cuneiform was also written on wax boards, which one example from the 8th century BC was found at Nimrud. The wax contained toxic amounts of arsenic. It was used to record laws, like the Code of Hammurabi. It was also used for recording maps, compiling medical manuals, and documenting religious stories and beliefs, among other uses. In particular it is thought to have been used to prepare surveying data and draft inscriptions for Kassite stone kudurru. Studies by Assyriologists like Claus Wilcke and Dominique Charpin suggest that cuneiform literacy was not reserved solely for the elite but was common for average citizens.

According to the Oxford Handbook of Cuneiform Culture, cuneiform script was used at a variety of literacy levels: average citizens needed only a basic, functional knowledge of cuneiform script to write personal letters and business documents. More highly literate citizens put the script to more technical use, listing medicines and diagnoses and writing mathematical equations. Scholars held the highest literacy level of cuneiform and mostly focused on writing as a complex skill and an art form.

Modern usage
Cuneiform is occasionally used nowadays as inspiration for logos.

Unicode

As of version 8.0, the following ranges are assigned to the Sumero-Akkadian Cuneiform script in the Unicode Standard:
U+12000–U+123FF (922 assigned characters) Cuneiform
U+12400–U+1247F (116 assigned characters) Cuneiform Numbers and Punctuation
U+12480–U+1254F (196 assigned characters) Early Dynastic Cuneiform

The final proposal for Unicode encoding of the script was submitted by two cuneiform scholars working with an experienced Unicode proposal writer in June 2004.
The base character inventory is derived from the list of Ur III signs compiled by the Cuneiform Digital Library Initiative of UCLA based on the inventories of Miguel Civil, Rykle Borger (2003) and Robert Englund. Rather than opting for a direct ordering by glyph shape and complexity, according to the numbering of an existing catalog, the Unicode order of glyphs was based on the Latin alphabetic order of their "last" Sumerian transliteration as a practical approximation. Once in Unicode, glyphs can be automatically processed into segmented transliterations.

List of major cuneiform tablet discoveries

See also

 Hieratic
 Babylonokia: a 21st-century cuneiform artwork
 Elamite cuneiform
 Hittite cuneiform
 Journal of Cuneiform Studies
 List of cuneiform signs
 List of museums of ancient Near Eastern art
 Old Persian cuneiform
 Ugaritic alphabet
 Urartian cuneiform 
 Proto-cuneiform numerals

Notes

References

Bibliography

 Adkins, Lesley, Empires of the Plain: Henry Rawlinson and the Lost Languages of Babylon, New York, St. Martin's Press (2003) 
 
 
 R. Borger, Assyrisch-Babylonische Zeichenliste, 2nd ed., Neukirchen-Vluyn (1981)
 
 Burnouf, E. (1836). "Mémoire sur deux Inscriptions Cunéiformes trouvées près d'Hamadan et qui font partie des papiers du Dr Schulz", [Memoir on two cuneiform inscriptions [that were] found near Hamadan and that form part of the papers of Dr. Schulz], Imprimerie Royale, Paris.
 Cammarosano, M. (2017–2018) "Cuneiform Writing Techniques", cuneiform.neocities.org (with further bibliography)
 Charvát, Petr. "Cherchez la femme: The SAL Sign in Proto-Cuneiform Writing". La famille dans le Proche-Orient ancien: réalités, symbolismes et images: Proceedings of the 55e Rencontre Assyriologique Internationale, Paris, edited by Lionel Marti, University Park, USA: Penn State University Press, 2021, pp. 169–182
 
 A. Deimel (1922), Liste der archaischen Keilschriftzeichen ("LAK"), WVDOG 40, Berlin.
 A. Deimel (1925–1950), Šumerisches Lexikon, Pontificum Institutum Biblicum.
 F. Ellermeier, M. Studt, Sumerisches Glossar
 vol. 1: 1979–1980, 
 vol. 3.2: 1998–2005, A-B , D-E , G 
 vol. 3.3:  (font CD )
 vol. 3.5: 
 vol 3.6: 2003, Handbuch Assur 
 Robert K. Englund, Roger J. Matthews, "Proto-Cuneiform Texts from Diverse Collections", Berlin: Gebr. Mann 1996 ISBN 978-3786118756 
 Robert K. Englund and Rainer M.Boehmer, "Archaic Administrative Texts from Uruk – The Early Campaigns", (ATU Bd. 5), Berlin: Gebr. Mann Verlag 1994 ISBN 978-3786117452 
 A. Falkenstein, Archaische Texte aus Uruk, Berlin-Leipzig (1936)
 Charpin, Dominique. 2004. 'Lire et écrire en Mésopotamie: une affaire dé spécialistes?' Comptes rendus de l'Académie des Inscriptions et Belles Lettres: 481–501.
 E. Forrer, Die Keilschrift von Boghazköi, Leipzig (1922)
 J. Friedrich, Hethitisches Keilschrift-Lesebuch, Heidelberg (1960)
 Jean-Jacques Glassner, The Invention of Cuneiform, English translation, Johns Hopkins University Press (2003), .
 
 Heeren (1815) "Ideen über die Politik, den Verkehr und den Handel der vornehmsten Volker der alten Welt", vol. i. pp. 563 seq., translated into English in 1833.
 
 René Labat, Manuel d'epigraphie Akkadienne, Geuthner, Paris (1959); 6th ed., extended by Florence Malbran-Labat (1999), .
 Lassen, Christian (1836) Die Altpersischen Keil-Inschriften von Persepolis. Entzifferung des Alphabets und Erklärung des Inhalts. [The Old-Persian cuneiform inscriptions of Persepolis. Decipherment of the alphabet and explanation of its content.] Eduard Weber, Bonn, (Germany).
 
 Moorey, P. R. S. (1992). A Century of Biblical Archaeology. Westminster Knox Press. . 
 O. Neugebauer, A. Sachs (eds.), Mathematical Cuneiform Texts, New Haven (1945).
 Ouyang, Xiaoli, and Christine Proust, "Place-Value Notations in the Ur III Period: Marginal Numbers in Administrative Texts", Cultures of Computation and Quantification in the Ancient World: Numbers, Measurements, and Operations in Documents from Mesopotamia, China and South Asia. Cham: Springer International Publishing, pp. 267-356, 2023
 Patri, Sylvain (2009). "La perception des consonnes hittites dans les langues étrangères au XIIIe siècle." Zeitschrift für Assyriologie und vorderasiatische Archäologie 99(1): 87–126. .
 Prichard, James Cowles (1844).  "Researches Into the Physical History of Mankind", 3rd ed., vol IV, Sherwood, Gilbert and Piper, London.
 Philippe Quenet, "The Diffusion of the Cuneiform Writing System in Northern Mesopotamia: The Earliest Archaeological Evidence", Iraq, vol. 67, no. 2, pp. 31–40, 2005
 Rawlinson, Henry (1847) "The Persian Cuneiform Inscription at Behistun, decyphered and translated; with a Memoir on Persian Cuneiform Inscriptions in general, and on that of Behistun in Particular," The Journal of the Royal Asiatic Society of Great Britain and Ireland, vol. X. .
 Rune Rattenborg et al., Open Access Index for the Geographical Distribution of the Cuneiform Corpus, University of Uppsala, Cuneiform Digital Library Journal, Cuneiform Digital Library Initiative, 2021:001 ISSN 1540-8779 
 Y. Rosengarten, Répertoire commenté des signes présargoniques sumériens de Lagash, Paris (1967)
 Chr. Rüster, E. Neu, Hethitisches Zeichenlexikon (HZL), Wiesbaden (1989)
 Sayce, Rev. A. H. (1908). "The Archaeology of the Cuneiform Inscriptions", Second Edition-revised, 1908, Society for Promoting Christian Knowledge, London, Brighton, New York; at pp 9–16 Not in copyright
 Nikolaus Schneider, Die Keilschriftzeichen der Wirtschaftsurkunden von Ur III nebst ihren charakteristischsten Schreibvarianten, Keilschrift-Paläographie; Heft 2, Rom: Päpstliches Bibelinstitut (1935).
 Wilcke, Claus. 2000. Wer las und schrieb in Babylonien und Assyrien. Sitzungsberichte der Bayerischen Akademie der Wissenschaften Philosophisch-historische Klasse. 2000/6. München: Verlag der Bayerischen Akademie der Wissenschaften. 
 Wolfgang Schramm, Akkadische Logogramme, Goettinger Arbeitshefte zur Altorientalischen Literatur (GAAL) Heft 4, Goettingen (2003), .
 F. Thureau-Dangin, Recherches sur l'origine de l'écriture cunéiforme, Paris (1898).
 Ronald Herbert Sack, Cuneiform Documents from the Chaldean and Persian Periods, (1994)

External links
 Cuneiform Digital Library Initiative
 Tablet Collections, Cornell University
 Finding aid to the Columbia University Cuneiform Collection at Columbia University. Rare Book & Manuscript Library
 The Cuneiform Wide Web: From Card Catalogues to Digital Assyriology - Shai Gordin and Avital Romach - ANE Today - Oct 2022

 
Sumerian language
Akkadian language
Elamite language
Obsolete writing systems
Hittite language
Hurro-Urartian languages
Luwian language
Old Persian language
Ugaritic language and literature
4th-millennium BC establishments
1st-century disestablishments
History of writing
Writing systems of Asia